Bent Jensen (1908 – date of death unknown) was a former international speedway rider from Denmark.

Speedway career 
Jensen was a champion of Denmark, winning the Danish Championship in 1948. 

He was part of a famous motorsport family with three brothers NV Jensen, Svend Jensen and CO Jensen.

References 

1908 births
Year of death missing
Danish speedway riders